Marvin Warren Peasley (July 16, 1889 – December 27, 1948) was an American baseball left-handed pitcher. 

Peasely was born in 1889 in Jonesport, Maine. He developed a reputation as a pitcher while playing for Riker Institute in Houlton, Maine. He later played with "great success" for the Woodstock, New Brunswick, team during the summer of 1910.

Peasley played Major League Baseball for the Detroit Tigersin September 1910, appearing in two games and compiling a 0-1 record with an earned run average of 8.10 in 10 inning pitched. There was some concern in 1911, that his career would end due to the increase of muscle mass to his arms from working with an axe during the previous winter.

He later played for the Winnipeg Maroons in the Central International League in 1912.  

Peaseley died in 1948 at age 59 in San Francisco.

References

1889 births
1948 deaths
Detroit Tigers players
Major League Baseball pitchers
Baseball players from Maine
People from Washington County, Maine